The men's 63 kg (138.6 lbs) Light-Contact category at the W.A.K.O. World Championships 2007 in Belgrade was the second lightest of the male Light-Contact tournaments being the equivalent of the light welterweight division when compared to Low-Kick and K-1's weight classes.  There were twenty-two men from three continents (Europe, Asia and Africa) taking part in the competition.  Each of the matches was three rounds of two minutes each and were fought under Light-Contact rules. 

Due to the unequal number of fighters designed for a tournament fit for thirty-two, eleven of the contestants had a bye through to the second round.  The tournament winner was Croatian Marko Sarko, beating Hungarian Sandor Szanto by unanimous decision in their gold medal match.  Ukrainian Kostyantyn Demorets'kyy and Turk Murat Aydin won bronze medals having reached the semi finals.

Results

Key

See also
List of WAKO Amateur World Championships
List of WAKO Amateur European Championships
List of male kickboxers

References

External links
 WAKO World Association of Kickboxing Organizations Official Site

Kickboxing events at the WAKO World Championships 2007 Belgrade
2007 in kickboxing
Kickboxing in Serbia